Alfredo Gaona (25 November 1911 – 9 April 1986) was a Mexican boxer. He competed in the men's flyweight event at the 1928 Summer Olympics.

References

1911 births
1986 deaths
Mexican male boxers
Olympic boxers of Mexico
Boxers at the 1928 Summer Olympics
Boxers from Mexico City
Flyweight boxers